Jessey Tsang Tsui-shan is a Hong Kong film director, scriptwriter and documentary maker who has won multiple awards at various international film festivals. In 2012 she won a Hong Kong Film Award for Best New Director for her film Big Blue Lake.

Biography
Tsang studied sound design at the Hong Kong Academy for Performing Arts where she graduated in 2001. Afterwards she attended the City University of Hong Kong and completed her master's degree in 2005. While still studying at City University she directed her first solo film Lonely Planet in 2004 which was honored with a Silver Award by the IFVA. After winning another award at the South Taiwan Film Festival in 2009 for Lovers on the Road Tsang directed her most critically acclaimed work to date Big Blue Lake which won her Best New Director at the 31st Hong Kong Film Awards and the title of Best New Artist by the Hong Kong Art Development Council. Tsang's work Flowing Stories is a documentary about the small rural village of Ho Chung in Sai Kung District where she grew up. Released in 2014 the film focuses on the lives of villagers and their relative that have left to live overseas. She received FilmAid Asia Humanitarian Award in 2016 for her projects on environmental issues and disadvantaged communities.

Filmography

References

External links
 
 

Hong Kong film directors
Chinese women film directors
Living people
Year of birth missing (living people)